The 1923 Five Nations Championship was the ninth series of the rugby union Five Nations Championship following the inclusion of France into the Home Nations Championship. Including the previous Home Nations Championships, this was the thirty-sixth series of the annual northern hemisphere rugby union championship. Ten matches were played between 20 January and 14 April. It was contested by England, France, Ireland, Scotland and Wales.

Table

Results

References

External links

1923
Five Nations
Five Nations
Five Nations
Five Nations
Five Nations
Five Nations
Five Nations Championship
Five Nations Championship
Five Nations Championship
Five Nations Championship